Little Treasure is a 1985 American action drama film starring Margot Kidder, Ted Danson and Burt Lancaster.  The film, written and directed by Alan Sharp, deals with the strained relationship between a bank robber father and his daughter, a stripper.

Plot
Margot Kidder plays Margo, a stripper searching for her estranged, bank robber father (Burt Lancaster) in a remote part of Mexico.  Along the way, Margo meets an American ex-pat drifter (Ted Danson), and together they search for her missing father and eventually his lost, buried fortune.

Cast
 Margot Kidder as Margo
 Ted Danson as Eugene Wilson
 Burt Lancaster as Delbert Teschemacher
 Joseph Hacker as Norman Kane
 Malena Doria as Evangelina
 John Pearce as Joseph
 Gladys Holland as Sadie
 Bill Zuckert as Charlie Parker
 James Hall as Chuck
 Glenda Moore as Kane's Friend
 Rodolfo De Alexandre as Bird Seller
 Lupe Ontiveros as Market Voice #1

Production
Kidder recalled feuding with Lancaster during the production and described Danson as "about as sweet a guy as you’re ever gonna meet. What you see is what you get. He’s lovely."

Reception
Leonard Maltin gave the film one and a half stars.

References

External links
 
 
 
 

1985 films
1980s action drama films
American action drama films
Films set in Mexico
Films shot in New Mexico
TriStar Pictures films
Films set in New Mexico
1985 directorial debut films
1985 drama films
1980s English-language films
1980s American films